The 2017 Portland Thorns FC season was the team's and the league's fifth season of existence. The Thorns played in the National Women's Soccer League (NWSL), the top division of women's soccer in the United States. The Thorns had finished in first place in the 2016 season, but failed to advance from the semifinals in the 2016 NWSL playoffs. With a slogan of "Unfinished Business", they qualified for the NWSL playoffs as the 2nd ranked team in the 2017 regular season. In the playoffs, they defeated the Orlando Pride and then the North Carolina Courage to become 2017 NWSL Champions. It was their second championship, following the first in 2013.

This page covers from the day after the 2016 NWSL final to the day of the 2017 NWSL final.

Background

Season review

Off-season
On October 17, 2016, defender Kat Williamson announced her retirement from soccer.

On October 19, 2016, Portland Thorns FC exercised contract options on goalkeeper Adrianna Franch; defenders Meg Morris and Katherine Reynolds; midfielders Celeste Boureille, Dagný Brynjarsdóttir, Amandine Henry, and Kendall Johnson; and forwards Nadia Nadim, Hayley Raso, and Mallory Weber. Goalkeeper Michelle Betos, defender Emily Menges, and midfielder Meleana Shim went out of contract and were extended new contract offers. Michelle Betos would later confirm on her Twitter account that she did not accept the offer, while Menges and Shim did.

On October 27, 2016, Tobin Heath, Lindsey Horan, Allie Long, Meghan Klingenberg and goalkeeper Adrianna Franch were called up for USA for two friendly matches against Romania.

On November 2, 2016, Emily Menges received her first USA call up due to Meghan Klingenberg suffering from a back injury.

On November 8, 2016, Portland Thorns FC head coach Mark Parsons signed a long-term contract extension. Director of goalkeeping Nadine Angerer also signed a contract extension.

On December 13, 2016, Tobin Heath was named U.S. Soccer Female Player of the Year.

On December 15, 2016, Christine Sinclair was named Canadian Player of the Year.

On January 4, 2017, Tobin Heath, Lindsey Horan and Allie Long, Emily Sonnett and goalkeeper Adrianna Franch were called up by USA for an evaluation period for the upcoming SheBelieves Cup.

On January 12, 2017, Portland Thorns FC selected midfielders Rachel Hill and Caroline Flynn and forwards Savannah Jordan and Tyler Lussi from the 2017 NWSL College Draft.

On January 18, 2017, Portland Thorns FC acquired Orlando Pride's first-round and fourth-round 2018 NWSL College Draft picks for the rights to forward Rachel Hill, who was chosen by Portland in the 2017 NWSL College Draft.

On January 27, 2017, Amandine Henry was sent on a short-term loan to French side Paris Saint-Germain.

On February 8, 2017, Tobin Heath, Lindsey Horan and Allie Long, and defenders Meghan Klingenberg and Emily Sonnett were called up to the USA training camp ahead of the SheBelieves Cup.

On February 22, 2017, Portland Thorns FC re-signed defender Emily Menges and midfielder Meleana Shim.

On March 8, 2017, Portland Thorns FC traded two fourth round picks in the 2018 NWSL College Draft to the North Carolina Courage for goalkeeper Britt Eckerstrom.

Preseason
On March 13, 2017, Portland Thorns FC announced their 2017 preseason roster, which included 5 non-roster invites.

On March 26, 2017, Portland Thorns FC began their preseason tournament against the Chicago Red Stars.  There would be no cards and a single goal from Nadia Nadim in the 26th minute from a converted penalty.  Portland would go on to win their first preseason match 1–0.

On April 14, 2017, the Thorns signed defender Meghan Cox, who was an undrafted non-roster invitee to preseason camp.

April
On April 15, 2017, Portland Thorns FC hosted the Orlando Pride for the start of the 2017 NWSL campaign.  In the 32nd minute, Nadia Nadim successfully converted a penalty kick after an Orlando handball in the box.  In the 67th minute, Allie Long sent a cross to Christine Sinclair, who scored to put the Thorns up another goal. After the 2–0 win, they were tied for first place with Houston Dash and FC Kansas City.

On April 22, 2017, Portland Thorns FC went on the road for the first time to take on the North Carolina Courage, formerly the Western New York Flash, relocated and rebranded in the offseason.  North Carolina won 1–0 on a late goal from Debinha in the 81st minute.

On April 29, 2017, the Thorns returned home to defeat the Chicago Red Stars 1–0 on a Nadia Nadim penalty kick after a Christen Press handball in the box.

Position at the end of April

May
Thorns FC opened May by hosting their rivals Seattle Reign FC. In the 1st minute, Seattle's Jess Fishlock scored a long-range shot from 24 yards out. In the 37th minute, Fishlock scored again but instead this time in Seattle's own net, equalizing Portland 1–1. Shortly after in the 29th minute, Merritt Mathias, with an assist from Rebekah Stott, put Seattle back up, 2–1, at the end of the first half. Portland equalized again with a goal from Allie Long, assisted by Meghan Klingenberg, in the 82nd minute.  Both teams settled with a point from a final score of 2–2.

Position as of May 6

Competitions
{| class="wikitable" style="text-align: center"
|-
!rowspan=2|Competition
!colspan=8|Record
!Started round
!First match
!Last match
!Final position
|-
!
!
!
!
!
!
!
!
!colspan=4|
|-
| NWSL

|1
|April 15, 2017
|September 30, 2017
|Second place
|-
| NWSL Playoffs

|1
|October 7, 2017
|October 14, 2017
|Winners
|-
! Total

!colspan=4|

NWSL

Preseason

Providence Park Preseason Tournament

Regular season

League table

Matches

The 2017 NWSL Regular Season schedule was released on March 1, 2017. On June 12, the league changed kickoff times for several matches to accommodate hydration breaks during television broadcasts and implemented new guidelines for playing in extreme heat, and also allowed teams to reschedule backup games for television to later kickoff times.

Results by round

Home/away results

NWSL Playoffs

Semifinal:

Final:

Following the win in the Final, the Thorns were crowned 2017 NWSL Champions.

Club

Executive staff

Coaching staff

Stadiums

Kits

Primary kit

The Thorns primarily wear red Nike Vapor match kit with gray shoulders, red shorts, and red socks. Providence Health & Services remains their kit sponsor as in past seasons. The Lifetime logo is printed in a white circle on the right sleeve, and the league logo is printed on the left sleeve. A 5th-anniversary logo is printed above the shirt's lower-left hemline.

Secondary kit

The Thorns' alternate kit are white Nike Laser shirts with black sleeve cuffs, white shorts, and white socks. This is unchanged from 2016, with the exception of the Lifetime logo printed in a red circle on the right sleeve and the 5th-anniversary logo.

Squad information

First team squad

Last updated: September 2, 2017

 (HG) = homegrown player
 (FP) = Federation player
 (Loan) = on loan
 (AP) = amateur player

Player transactions

National Team/Federation player allocation

Transfers in

Loans in

Loans out

Transfers out

Contract extensions

Player's rights purchased

Player's rights sold

National Women's Soccer League College Draft 

The draft was held on January 12, 2017.

Staff in

Staff contract extensions

Staff out

National team participation 
Seven Thorns players have been called up to play for their national teams during this season.

Honors and awards

NWSL Player of the Month

NWSL Weekly Awards

NWSL Player of the Week

NWSL Goal of the Week

NWSL Save of the Week

Other awards

Statistics

Appearances

Goalkeeper stats

Top scorers

Top assists

Clean sheets

Summary
All statistics are for National Women's Soccer League games.

See also
 2017 National Women's Soccer League season

References

External links

 

Portland Thorns FC
Portland Thorns FC seasons
Portland Thorns FC
Portland Thorns FC
Portland